Hite House is an historic hotel building which is located in Stoystown, Somerset County, Pennsylvania.

Part of the Stoystown Historic District, it was added to the National Register of Historic Places in 1998.

History and architectural features 
 A three-and-one-half-story, "L"-shaped, wood-frame building with a brick veneer on a stone foundation, Hite House features a twelve-foot-deep, one-story porch across its front facade. 

The original building was built in 1853 by John H. Hite, and was then extensively enlarged and remodeled sometime around 1914, and again in 1920.

It was added to the National Register of Historic Places in 1998, it is included in the Stoystown Historic District.

References

Hotel buildings on the National Register of Historic Places in Pennsylvania
Hotel buildings completed in 1920
Buildings and structures in Somerset County, Pennsylvania
National Register of Historic Places in Somerset County, Pennsylvania
1853 establishments in Pennsylvania